An election to South Pembrokeshire District Council was held in May 1976. An Independent majority was maintained. It was preceded by the 1973  election and followed by the 1979 election. On the same day there were elections to the other local authorities and community councils in Wales.

Results

Amroth (one seat)

Angle (one seat)

Begelly (one seat)

Carew (one seat)

Cosheston(one seat)

Hundleton (one seat)

Lampeter Velfrey (one seat)

Maenclochog (one seat)

Manorbier(one seat)

Martletwy and Slebech (one seat)

Narberth North / South (one seat)

Narberth Urban (one seat)

Pembroke Central (two seats)

Pembroke East (three seats)

Pembroke Llanion (two seats)

Pembroke Market (two seats)

Pembroke Pennar (two seats)

Penally(one seat)

St Issels (two seats)

Tenby North (two seats)

Tenby South (two seats)

References

1976
1976 Welsh local elections
May 1976 events in the United Kingdom